Nikolay Kharkov (born 1890, date of death unknown) was a Russian middle-distance runner. He competed in the men's 1500 metres at the 1912 Summer Olympics.

References

1890 births
Year of death missing
Athletes (track and field) at the 1912 Summer Olympics
Male middle-distance runners from the Russian Empire
Olympic competitors for the Russian Empire
Place of birth missing